Wang Sai is a tambon (subdistrict) of Pak Chong District, in Nakhon Ratchasima Province, Thailand. In 2020 it had a total population of 11,431 people.

History
The subdistrict was created effective August 1, 1984 by splitting off 5 administrative villages from Nong Sarai.

Administration

Central administration
The tambon is subdivided into 18 administrative villages (muban).

Local administration
The whole area of the subdistrict is covered by the subdistrict municipality (Thesaban Tambon) Wang Sai (เทศบาลตำบลวังไทร).

References

External links
Thaitambon.com on Wang Sai

Tambon of Nakhon Ratchasima Province
Populated places in Nakhon Ratchasima province